Sanjay Narvekar (born 1962) is an Indian actor who works in Hindi and Marathi cinema. He mainly is a Marathi actor, who works in TV shows and films.

His portrayal of Raghu (Sanjay Dutt)'s sidekick, "Dedh Footia" (lit. One and a half-footer, referring to the short stature of his character) in the popular Hindi film Vaastav (1999) was appreciated by critics and audiences alike. His on-screen portrayal of a simple underdog, son of the soil, guy next door remains his most characteristic and endearing feature in most of his films as well as his real life. Together with Siddharth Jadhav, he has teamed up in many hit Marathi movies, forming one of the most successful and hilarious pairs in contemporary Marathi cinema.

Early and personal life 
Narvekar was born in Malvan, Sindhudurg. He lives in Powai, Mumbai, India with his wife and his son Aryan S. Narvekar, who recently made his debut with the Marathi film Bokya Satbande.

Professional

Marathi films
 Ye Re Ye Re Paisa 2 (2019)
 Thackeray (2019)
 Khari Biscuit (2019)
 Ye Re Ye Re Paisa (2018)
 Marathon Zindagi (2017)
 1234 (2016)
 35% Katavar Pass (2016)
 Ladigodi (2016)
 Well Done Bhaiya (2016)
 Bandh Nylon Che (2016)
 Just Gammat (2015)
 Zentleman (2014)
 Cappuccino (2014)
 Bai La Ho Baikola Kho (2013)
 Ashach Eka Betavar (2013)
 Tatya Vinchu Lage Raho (2013)
 Ghulam Begum Badshaha (2013)
 Fakt Satvi Paas (2012)
 Har Har Mahadev (2012)
 Baburao La Pakda (2012)
 Gola Berij (2012)
 Karj (2012)
 Fakta Ladh Mhana (2011)
 Dhaav Manya Dhaav (2011)
 Mohaan Aawatey (2011)
 5 Naar 1 Bejaar (2011)
 Shahan Pan Dega Deva (2011)
 Aata Ga Baya (2011)
 Agni Pariksha (2010)
 Laadi Godi (2010)
 Kalshekar Aahet Ka? (2010)
 Nashibachi Aisi Taisi (2009)
 बे दुणे साडेचार (2009)
 Lonavla Bypass (2009)
 Chal Lavkar (2009)
 Target (Telugu|Hindi|Marathi; 2009)
 Chand Ke Paar Chalo (2009)
 Nau Mahine Nau Divas (2009)
 Ghud Ghoose (2009)
 Lonavla Bypass (2009)
 Gaav Tasa Changla (2009)
 Dhudgus (2008)
 Rangrao Chowdhary (2008)
 Checkmate (2008)
 Chashme Bahaddar (2007)
 Lagnacha Dhum Dhadaka (2007)
 Tula Shikvin Changlach Dhada (2007)
 Zabardast (2007)
 Aai No. 1 (2007)
 Karz Kunkavache (2006)
 Aga Bai Arrecha! (2004)
 Sarivar Sari
 Khabardar
 Aata Pita
 Nau Mahine Nau Divas

Telugu films
 Lottery (2013)

Hindi films
 HIT: The First Case (2022) as Shrikant Saxena
 Serious Men (2020) as Keshav Dharve
 Jaane Hoga Kya (2006) as Police Officer Jadhav
 Chand Ke Paar Chalo as Johnny
 Ram Gopal Varma Ki Aag as Ramlal Bhatt
 Kismat (2004) as Goli
 Hungama (2003) as Anil Singh
 Pran Jaye Par Shaan Na Jaye as Babban Rao
 Hathyar (2002) as Dedh Footiya (cameo appearance)
 Pyaasa
 Ehsaas: The Feeling (2001)
 Yeh Teraa Ghar Yeh Meraa Ghar (2001)
 Bas Itna Sa Khwaab Hai
 Jodi No.1 as Bedi
 Fiza
 Vaastav: The Reality  (1999) as Chandrakant Kumar a.k.a "Dedh Footiya"
 Baaghi (2000) as Chakku
 Deewaar (2004)
 Indian (1996)
 Ek Aur Ek Gyaarah
 Ek Pyaar Ka Nagma Hai
 Love Recipe (2012)
 Chaar Deewane Aur Ek Deewani Bhi (2012)

Television shows
 Ghum Hai Kisikey Pyaar Meiin (2020) as Inspector Kamal Joshi
 Escaype live (2022) 
 Tujya Ishqacha Naadkhula (2021) as ACP Gautam Salvi

Awards and nominations

Filmfare Awards
 2000: Nominated, Best Supporting Actor for Vaastav: The Reality

References

External links
 

Marathi actors
Living people
Male actors from Mumbai
Male actors in Marathi cinema
Male actors in Hindi cinema
Indian male film actors
People from Sindhudurg district
Indian male stage actors
Male actors in Marathi television
1962 births